KTBN (formerly known as KUSW) was the shortwave radio outlet of the Trinity Broadcasting Network, a large religious international broadcaster. The station's programming was a simulcast of the audio portion of the TBN television service.

History
KUSW, which was also branded "The Superpower", officially launched on December 26, 1987 during the peak years of the American commercial shortwave broadcasting boom triggered by the founding of WRNO Worldwide. Owned by Carlson Communications International, which owned a network of AM and FM stations in Utah, Nevada, and Arizona, KUSW broadcast a combination of news and rock music. The station also carried selected Utah Jazz games. The station also offered a mail-order catalog of products made in the Rocky Mountains. The station's "theme song", used as an interval signal for sign-ons, sign-offs, and to signal frequency changes, was "Telegraph Road" by Dire Straits.

Carlson sold the station to the TBN ministry in 1990 for approximately $2 million. The station signed off under its old format on December 16 of that year, to be relaunched under the KTBN callsign two days later. To celebrate the format/ownership change, TBN founders Paul and Jan Crouch staged a televised demolition, whereas a false representation of KUSW's former library of rock albums was exploded in a Disco Demolition Night-esque manner.

As early as June 2004, KTBN broadcast warnings that it would leave the air due to "lack of [listener] response".  Although the station continued for several years after these announcements, pages dedicated to the KTBN shortwave service were deleted from the TBN website in 2005. The station ceased operations on March 30, 2008.

After its final sign-off, the station equipment, including the transmitter and antenna array, was dismantled and shipped to Anguilla in the Caribbean to be incorporated into the Caribbean Beacon radio station.

Frequencies 
At the time of its last broadcasts, KTBN could be heard on the following frequencies:

English to North America: 7.505 MHz from 0100 to 1500 UTC; 15.59 MHz from 1500 to 0100 UTC.

See also 

 Trinity Broadcasting Network
 International broadcasting
 Shortwave Radio

References

External links 
 Official Website
 FCC info for KTBN

Shortwave radio stations in the United States
International broadcasters
Trinity Broadcasting Network affiliates
Defunct radio stations in the United States
Radio stations established in 1987
Defunct religious radio stations in the United States
Radio stations disestablished in 2008
1987 establishments in Utah
2008 disestablishments in Utah
TBN